The highest-ranking bishops in Eastern Orthodoxy, Oriental Orthodoxy, the Catholic Church (above major archbishop and primate), the Hussite Church, Church of the East, and some Independent Catholic Churches are termed patriarchs (and in certain cases also popes – such as the Pope of Rome or Pope of Alexandria, and catholicoi – such as Catholicos Karekin II).

The word is derived from Greek πατριάρχης (patriarchēs), meaning "chief or father of a family", a compound of πατριά (patria), meaning "family", and ἄρχειν (archein), meaning "to rule".

Originally, a patriarch was a man who exercised autocratic authority as a pater familias over an extended family. The system of such rule of families by senior males is termed patriarchy. Historically, a patriarch has often been the logical choice to act as ethnarch of the community identified with his religious confession within a state or empire of a different creed (such as Christians within the Ottoman Empire). The term developed an ecclesiastical meaning within Christianity. The office and the ecclesiastical circumscription of a Christian patriarch is termed a patriarchate.

Abraham, Isaac, and Jacob are referred to as the three patriarchs of the people of Israel, and the period during which they lived is termed the Patriarchal Age. The word patriarch originally acquired its religious meaning in the Septuagint version of the Bible.

Catholic Church

Patriarchs

In the Catholic Church, the bishop who is head of a particular autonomous church, known in canon law as a church sui iuris, is ordinarily a patriarch, though this responsibility can be entrusted to a major archbishop, metropolitan, or other prelate for a number of reasons.

Since the Council of Nicaea, the bishop of Rome has been recognized as the first among patriarchs. That council designated three bishops with this 'supra-Metropolitan' title: Rome, Alexandria, and Antioch. In the Pentarchy formulated by Justinian I (527–565), the emperor assigned as a patriarchate to the Bishop of Rome the whole of Christianized Europe (including almost all of modern Greece), except for the region of Thrace, the areas near Constantinople, and along the coast of the Black Sea. He included in this patriarchate also the western part of North Africa. The jurisdictions of the other patriarchates extended over Roman Asia, and the rest of Africa. Justinian's system was given formal ecclesiastical recognition by the Quinisext Council of 692, which the see of Rome has, however, not recognized.

There were at the time bishops of other apostolic sees that operated with patriarchal authority beyond the borders of the Roman Empire, such as the Catholicos of Selucia-Ctesephon.

Today, the patriarchal heads of Catholic autonomous churches are:
 The Bishop of Rome (Pope), as head of the Latin Catholic Church
 The Coptic Catholic Patriarch of Alexandria and head of the Coptic Catholic Church, recognised 1824
The Maronite Catholic Patriarch of Antioch and all the East and head of the Maronite Catholic Church, recognised 685
 The Melkite Greek Catholic Patriarchate of Antioch and All the East, of Alexandria and of Jerusalem, head of the Melkite Greek Catholic Church; in his case, Antioch is the actual and sole patriarchate, Alexandria and Jerusalem are just titular (once residential) patriarchates vested in his see.
The Syriac Catholic Patriarch of Antioch and all the East and head of the Syriac Catholic Church
The Patriarch of Babylon of the Chaldeans and head of the Chaldean Catholic Church, recognised 1553
The Catholic Patriarch of Cilicia of the Armenians and head of the Armenian Catholic Church, recognised 1742

Major archbishoprics
Four more of the Eastern Catholic Churches are headed by a prelate known as a "Major Archbishop," a title essentially equivalent to that of Patriarch and originally created by Pope Paul VI in 1963 for Josyf Slipyj:
The Major Archbishop of Kyiv-Halych and head of the Ukrainian Greek Catholic Church
The Major Archbishop of Ernakulam-Angamaly and head of the Syro-Malabar Catholic Church
The Major Archbishop of Trivandrum and head of the Syro-Malankara Catholic Church
The Major Archbishop of Făgăraş and Alba Iulia and head of the Romanian Greek Catholic Church

Within their proper sui iuris churches there is no difference between patriarchs and major archbishops. However, differences exist in the order of precedence (i.e. patriarchs take precedence over major archbishops) and in the mode of accession. Whereas the election of a major archbishop has to be confirmed by the pope before he may take office, no papal confirmation is needed for a newly elected patriarch before he takes office. Rather, a newly installed patriarch is required to petition the pope as soon as possible for the concession of what is called ecclesiastical communion. Furthermore, patriarchs who are created cardinals form part of the order of cardinal bishops, whereas major archbishops are only created cardinal priests.

Minor Latin patriarchates
Minor patriarchs do not have jurisdiction over other metropolitan bishops. The title is granted purely as an honor for various historical reasons. They take precedence after the heads of autonomous churches in full communion, whether pope, patriarch, or major archbishop. 
The Latin Patriarch of Jerusalem, established 1099.
The Patriarch of the East Indies a titular patriarchal see, united to Goa and Daman, established 1886.
The Patriarch of Lisbon, established 1716.
The Patriarch of Venice, established 1451.

Historical Latin patriarchates
 The Patriarch of Aquileia – with rival line of succession moved to Grado – dissolved in 1752.
 The Patriarch of Grado – in 1451 merged with the Bishopric of Castello and Venice to form the Metropolitan Archdiocese of Venice (later a residential Patriarchate itself).
 The Patriarch of the West Indies – a titular patriarchal see, vacant since 1963.
 The Latin Patriarch of Antioch – title abolished in 1964.
 The titular Latin Patriarch of Alexandria – title abolished in 1964.
 The Latin Patriarch of Constantinople – title abolished in 1964.
 The Latin Patriarchate of Ethiopia – 1555 to 1663, never effective, only held by Iberian Jesuits

Patriarch as title ad personam 
The pope can confer the rank of patriarch without any see, upon an individual archbishop, as happened on 24 February 1676 to Alessandro Crescenzi, of the Somascans, former Latin Titular Patriarch of Alexandria (19 January 1671 – retired 27 May 1675), who nevertheless resigned the title on 9 January 1682.

"Patriarch of the West"

In theological and other scholarly literature of the Early Modern period, the title "Patriarch of the West" (Latin: Patriarcha Occidentis; Greek: Πατριάρχης τῆς Δύσεως) was mainly used as designation for the jurisdiction of the Bishop of Rome over the Latin Church in the West. From 1863 to 2005, the title "Patriarch of the West" was appended to the list of papal titles in the Annuario Pontificio, which in 1885 became a semi-official publication of the Holy See. This was done without historical precedent or theological justification: There was no ecclesiastical office as such, except occasionally as a truism: the patriarch of Rome, for the Latin Church, was the only patriarch, and the only apostolic see, in the "west".

The title was not included in the 2006 Annuario. On 22 March 2006, the Pontifical Council for Promoting Christian Unity offered an explanation for the decision to remove the title. It stated that the title "Patriarch of the West" had become "obsolete and practically unusable" when the term the West comprises Australia, New Zealand and North America in addition to Western Europe, and that it was "pointless to insist on maintaining it" given that, since the Second Vatican Council, the Latin Church, for which "the West" is an equivalent, has been organized as a number of episcopal conferences and their international groupings.

Though the formulation "Patriarch of the West" is no longer used, the pope in that role issues the Code of Canon Law for the Latin Church. During the Synod of Bishops on the Middle East in 2009, Pope Benedict XVI appeared, as patriarch of the Latin Church, with the other patriarchs, but without the Latin patriarch of Jerusalem, though he was present at the same synod.

Current and historical Catholic patriarchates

Non-Catholic Eastern Christianity

Eastern Orthodox

The five ancient Patriarchates, the Pentarchy, listed in order of preeminence ranked by the Quinisext Council in 692: 

The five junior Patriarchates created after the consolidation of the Pentarchy, in chronological order of their recognition as Patriarchates by the Ecumenical Patriarchate of Constantinople:

Patriarchs outside the Eastern Orthodox Communion

Oriental Orthodox Churches

Church of the East

Catholicose of the East is the title that has been held by the ecclesiastical heads of the Church of the East, the Grand Metropolitan of Seleucia-Ctesiphon, since AD. 280.

It refers to Patriarchs of the Church of the East, primate (Catholicos-Patriarch) of the Church of the East now divided into:
Catholicos-Patriarch of the Assyrian Church of the East.
Catholicos-Patriarchs of the Ancient Church of the East (since 1964)

Other Christian denominations 
The title of "Patriarch" is assumed also by the leaders of certain Christian denominations, who are seldom in communion with none of the historic Christian Churches. Many, but not necessarily all such patriarchs are church leaders of the following Churches:

Hussite
The Patriarch of the Czechoslovak Hussite Church mainly in the Czech Republic and also some parts of Slovakia.

Independent Catholic
The Patriarch of the Catholic Apostolic Church of Antioch.
The Patriarch Juan Almario E.M. Calampiano of the Apostolic Catholic Church in the Philippines.
The Patriarch of the Brazilian Catholic Apostolic Church in Brazil (Not officially used, but described in a similarly holy level).
Patriarch Dr. +John Paul Hozvicka "Servant of Christ Jesus of the Catholic Faith" United States
The Patriarch of the Venezuelan Catholic Apostolic Church in Venezuela.

Independent Eastern Catholic 
The Patriarch of the Ukrainian Orthodox Greek Catholic Church in Ukraine.

Independent Eastern Orthodox
The Patriarch of the American Orthodox Catholic Church.

Independent Oriental Orthodox
The Patriarch of the British Orthodox Church.

Protestant
The Patriarch of the International Communion of the Charismatic Episcopal Church.

Latter Day Saint movement

In the Latter Day Saint movement, a patriarch is one who has been ordained to the office of patriarch in the Melchizedek priesthood. The term is considered synonymous with the term evangelist, a term favored by the Community of Christ. In the Church of Jesus Christ of Latter-day Saints, one of the patriarch's primary responsibilities is to give patriarchal blessings, as Jacob did to his twelve sons according to the Old Testament. Patriarchs are typically assigned in each stake and possess the title for life.

Manichaeism 
The term patriarch has also been used for the leader of the extinct Manichaean religion, initially based at Ctesiphon (near modern-day Baghdad) and later at Samarkand.

See also

 List of current patriarchs
 Lists of Patriarchs
 Catholicos
 Patriarchate
 Patriarchy
 Matriarchy
 List of Bishops and Archbishops
 Major archbishop
 List of Metropolitans and Patriarchs of Moscow
 Rishama in Mandaeism

References

Further reading

External links 
 Current and former patriarchates of the Catholic Church (GCatholic)
 Current titular patriarchal sees of the Catholic Church (GCatholic)
 Current patriarchates of the Catholic Church (GCatholic).
 WorldStatesmen - Religious Organisations
 
 

 
Catholic ecclesiastical titles
Episcopacy in Eastern Orthodoxy
Episcopacy in Oriental Orthodoxy
Christian terminology